Petrova Niva ("Peter's field") is a historic area in the Strandzha mountains of southeastern Bulgaria where, between 11 and 13 July 1903, a group of Bulgarian Internal Macedonian-Adrianople Revolutionary Organization (IMARO) delegates announced the outbreak of an anti-Ottoman uprising aimed at liberating southern Thrace from Ottoman rule and proclaimed the Strandzha Republic.

The area lies on the land of the village of Stoilovo in Malko Tarnovo municipality, Burgas Province, within the territory of Strandzha Nature Park. It is among the 100 Tourist Sites of Bulgaria; a monument to the event was built in the 1950s and a church dedicated to Saint Petka was constructed in 2003 for the congress' centennial anniversary, as well as a museum.

The IMARO congress at Petrova Niva was attended by over 300 people, of whom 47 were official delegates. Most of the delegates came from the region of Malko Tarnovo, though the areas of Edirne and Western Thrace were also represented. The congress mostly discussed the very question of whether to organize an uprising, but discussions ceased as the IMARO leadership had already instigated a revolt in the region of Bitola. Despite the lack of enough armaments and the varying preparedness of the local committees, the delegates agreed to aid the insurgents in Macedonia. The rebellions in Macedonia and Thrace are collectively known as the Ilinden–Preobrazhenie Uprising.

Delegates
The 47 delegates at the Petrova Niva IMARO congress were:

Gallery

References

Rebellions against the Ottoman Empire
Internal Macedonian Revolutionary Organization
Bulgarian rebellions
Conflicts in 1903
1903 in Bulgaria
20th-century rebellions
Strandzha
Geography of Burgas Province
Ottoman Thrace
Malko Tarnovo
Rebellions in Bulgaria